Spor may refer to:
 Jon Gooch (born 1984), British DJ
 Spor (Slavic demon), a frumentaceous demon in Slavic mythology